Below is a list of aircraft retired from service from the Pakistan Air Force.

Retired aircraft

|- 
|Chengdu F-7P Skybolt
| 
| Jet
| Interceptor  
| 1988
| 2020 || 120 || Replaced by Block 1 and Block 2 JF-17 Thunders
|-
| SA316 Aérospatiale Alouette III
| 
| Helicopter
| Search and rescue
| 1967
| 2019 || 35 || Replaced by AgustaWestland AW139s
|- 
|Shenyang FT-5
| 
| Jet
| Advanced Jet Trainer 
| 1975
| 2012 || 50 || Replaced by K-8P Karakorums
|- 
| Nanchang A-5III/C
| 
| Jet
| Attack
| 1983
| 2011
| ~55 
| Replaced by Block 1 JF-17 Thunders
|- 
| Shenyang F-6
| 
| Jet
| Fighter
| 1965
| 2002
| 253
| Replaced by F-7Ps and F-7PGs
|- 
| Mig-19
| 
| Jet
| Air superiority fighter
| 1965
| 2002 || 5 || Replaced by F-7Ps. Received several ex-Indonesian Air Force Mig-19S in December 1965 as part of a friendship deal between Pakistan and Indonesia.
|-  
|Lockheed T-33
| 
| Jet
| Trainer
| 1955
| 1993 || 21 || 15 T-33A trainers, 6 RT-33A reconnaissance aircraft. Replaced by T-37s and K-8P Karakorums
|- 
| Kaman HH-43B
| 
| Helicopter
| Search and rescue
| 1964 
| 1993 || 4 || 4 in service in June 1972 and November 1993. 
|-
| Martin B-57 Canberra
| 
| Jet
| Bomber
| 1959
| 1985
| 28
| 2 x RB-57F and 2 x RB-57B served with No.24 ELINT Squadron.24 served with No.31Wing.
|- 
|Grumman SA-16A Albatross
| 
| Propeller
| Patrol
| 1950s
| 1981 || 4 || Search and Rescue, coastal patrol and maritime reconnaissance.
|- 
| Shenyang JJ-2/FT-2
| 
| Jet
| Fighter
| 1966
| 1980 || 6 
| Chinese-built Mikoyan-Gurevich MiG-15 UTI (called U-MiG-15 in the PAF). Replaced by FT-6s. 
|-
|North American F-86 Sabre
| 
| Jet
| Fighter
| 1955
| 1980 
| 210 
| 120 x North American F-86F, 90 ex-Iranian Canadair CL-13B Sabre. Replaced by Mirage IIIs and Mirage 5s
|- 
|Lockheed F-104 Starfighter
| 
| Jet
| Fighter
| 1961
| 1972 || 12 || 10 x F-104A, 2 x F-104B. under Royal Pakistan Air Scouts
|- 
|Sikorsky H-19D
| 
| Helicopter
| Search and rescue
| 1950s
| 1971 || 8 || First helicopter operated by the PAF.
|- 
|North American T-6 HarvardT-6G
| 
| Propeller
| Trainer
| 1947
| 1970s || 12 || Introduced on formation of the Royal Pakistan Air Force.
|- 
|Hawker Siddeley TridentTrident 1E 
| 
| Jet
| Transport
| 1967
| 1970 || 4 || VIP transport.
|-
|Harbin H-5
| 
| Jet
| Bomber
| 1966
| 1969
| 16 || Chinese-built Ilyushin Il-28, designated B-56 in the PAF. 16 aircraft
|- 
|Bristol Freighter
| 
| Propeller
| Transport
| 1950s
| 1966 || 81 ||
|- 
|Hawker Sea Fury
| 
| Propeller
| Fighter
| 1949
| 1963 || ~97 || ~92 x FB 60. 5 x T-61 two-seat trainers. Replaced by F-104 Starfighters
|-
|Vickers VC.1 Viking
| 
| Propeller
| Transport
| 1947
| 1962 || 1 || VIP transport. Preserved in the PAF Museum.
|- 
|Supermarine Attacker F Mk.1
| 
| Jet
| Fighter
| 1951
| 1958 || 36 ||. "De-navalised" Attacker with tail hook removed and wings "locked down". First jet fighter in PAF service.
|- 
|de Havilland Tiger Moth
| 
| Propeller
| Trainer
| 1947
| 1957
|| 7 || Biplane. Introduced on formation of the Royal Pakistan Air Force.
|- 
|Hawker Tempest II
| 
| Propeller
| Fighter
| 1947 
| 1956 || 16 || Received on formation of the Royal Pakistan Air Force.
|-
|Douglas Dakota
| 
| Propeller
| Transport
| 1947
| 1955 || 2 || Introduced on formation of the Royal Pakistan Air Force.
|- 
|Handley Page Halifax
| 
| Propeller
| Bomber
| 1948
| 1954
| 16
| 
|- 
|Supermarine Spitfire Mk VIII
| 
| Propeller
| Fighter
| 1947
| 1947 ||   || 
|- 
|Bell H-13 Sioux
| 
| Helicopter
| Light observation
| 
|  || ~13 || 
|}

See also
List of active Pakistan Air Force aircraft
PAF Museum, Karachi

References

Pakistan Air Force, retired
Aircraft, Retired
Aircraft